USS Whirlwind has been the name of more than one United States Navy ship, and may refer to:

 , a patrol vessel in commission in 1917 and again in 1918
 , a patrol craft in commission since 1995

United States Navy ship names